The Raggedy Man is a poem written by James Whitcomb Riley and first published in 1888.  The poem was the inspiration for the Raggedy Ann doll, and two films of the same name.  The poem is one of Riley's most famous works.  It was inspired by a German tramp employed by Riley's father during his youth.

References

External links

The Raggedy Man at American Poems

James Whitcomb Riley
American poems
Poems
Indiana culture